Sean Nial Farren (born 6 September 1939) is an Irish Social Democratic and Labour Party (SDLP) politician and academic who was a Member of the Northern Ireland Assembly (MLA) for North Antrim from  1998 to 2007.

Academic Career
Farren studied at the National University of Ireland, University College Dublin (BA), University of Essex (MA) and the University of Ulster (PhD). He worked as a teacher in Dublin, Switzerland and Sierra Leone before becoming a lecturer at the University of Ulster.

Since 2008 he has been a Visiting Professor in the School of Education at Ulster University. He has also been involved in a number of projects aimed at strengthening democratic institutions in the Middle East, North Africa, West and East Africa.

He is currently a member of the Governing Authority of Dublin City University, a Trustee of Concern Worldwide (UK), a member of the Standing Committee of the Development Studies Association of Ireland (DSAI) and a committee member of the Sierra Leone Ireland Partnership (SLIP).

Political Career
Farren contested the Westminster seat of North Antrim as a member of the Social Democratic and Labour Party (SDLP) at the 1979 general election, and stood at each subsequent general election until 2005.

In 1982, Farren was elected to the Northern Ireland Assembly in North Antrim. In line with SDLP policy, he instead sat on the New Ireland Forum (1983–4).

Farren was elected to the Northern Ireland Forum in 1996, again for North Antrim, and held this seat in the Northern Ireland Assembly in 1998 and 2003, before standing down at the 2007 election.

Personal
He is married to Patricia Clarke. They have four children. He and Patricia live in Portstewart, County Londonderry.

Publications
He has authored, co-authored or edited four books: 
 The Politics of Irish Education (1995)
 SDLP – the Struggle for Agreement in Northern Ireland (2010), with Robert Mulvihill
 Paths to a Settlement in Northern Ireland (2000)
 John Hume: Irish Peacemaker (2015) with Denis Haughey.

He has written many book chapters, peer reviewed and other articles. He also wrote the paper Sunningdale: An Agreement Too Soon?, in which the circumstances behind the agreement and the elements that caused its collapse are examined.

References

Northern Ireland Executive: Sean Farren Biography
Sunningdale: An Agreement too soon?

1939 births
Living people
Academics of Ulster University
Alumni of University College Dublin
Alumni of the University of Essex
Alumni of Ulster University
Alumni of the National University of Ireland
Northern Ireland MPAs 1982–1986
Members of the Northern Ireland Forum
Northern Ireland MLAs 1998–2003
Northern Ireland MLAs 2003–2007
Ministers of the Northern Ireland Executive (since 1999)
People from Portstewart
Social Democratic and Labour Party MLAs
Ministers of Finance and Personnel of Northern Ireland